Alexei Ivanovich Vvedensky was a Russian botanist.

He was an expert on the genera Allium and Tulipa. He carried out extensive explorations of Uzbekistan, and compiled the 1941-1962 'Flora Uzbekistana in conjunction' with R.R. Schreder and E.P. Korovin.

He also contributed to the Tajikistan flora section, 'Flora Tadzhikskoj SSR' (which was edited by P.N. Ovczinnikov, 1963) and the Kyrgyzstan flora, 'Flora Kirgiskoj SSR' (1950-1962) with B.K. Shishkin. He published a manual of Central Asian plants (in Russian) with R.V. Kamelin. An English edition of his treatment of the genus Allium from the 'Flora of the USSR' (1935) was then published in 1944 (with an English translation by H.K.A. Shaw).

Vvedensky was a member of the Russian Academy of Sciences.

In 1947, botanist Yevgeni Korovin published Vvedenskya, which is a genus of flowering plants from Uzbekistan belonging to the family Apiaceae and it was named in Alexei Ivanovich Vvedensky's honour.

Among the many species also named in his honour is 'Vvedensky's Tulip', Tulipa vvedenskyi .

446 names of plant species have been published by Vvedensky.

References

Other sources
 A.A. Fedorov, 1971, "Floristics in the USSR", BioScience, 21(11): 515
 D.G. Frodin, 2001, Guide to Standard Floras of the World: 685.

Soviet botanists
1898 births
1972 deaths
National University of Uzbekistan alumni